Kumyk may refer to:
 Kumyks
 Kumyk language

Language and nationality disambiguation pages